Snebordet is a mountain located in the Sermersooq region of Greenland. The mountain has an elevation 3,150 meters (10,335 feet) and a prominence of 760 meters (2,493 feet). Snebordet is the highest peak of the Lindbergh Range and the 9th tallest mountain in Greenland.

See also 

 List of mountains in Greenland

References 

Mountains of Greenland